Remains of the Gods is the second studio album by melodic death metal band Light This City.

Track listing
 "Remains of the Gods" – 4:00
 "Obituary" – 3:05
 "A Guardian in a Passerby" – 3:07
 "The Hunt" – 2:46
 "Letter to My Abuser" – 3:19
 "Fractured by the Fall" – 4:16
 "The Static Masses" – 3:24
 "Guiding the North Star" – 2:42
 "Your Devoted Victim" – 4:35
 "The Last Catastrophe" (Instrumental) – 2:44

Personnel
Laura Nichol − vocals
Mike Dias − bass guitar
Ben Murray − drums, guitar

References

Light This City albums
2005 albums